Devakottai taluk is a taluk of Sivagangai district of the Indian state of Tamil Nadu. The headquarters of the taluk is the town of Devakottai

Demographics
According to the 2011 census, the taluk of Devakottai had a population of 157,328 with 79,545  males and 77,783 females. There were 978 women for every 1000 men. The taluk had a literacy rate of 75.65. Child population in the age group below 6 was 6,933 Males and 6,646 Females.

References 

Taluks of Sivaganga district